In dentistry, the approximal surfaces are those surfaces which form points of contact between adjacent teeth. However, in diastematic individuals these surfaces may not make contact but are still considered approximal. Due to the topography of approximal sites the removal of plaque by brushing may be difficult and hence a significant build-up may occur increasing the risk of plaque-related diseases such as dental caries or gingivitis. It is recommended that teeth be professionally cleaned every six months, in part, to avoid this build-up and therefore maintain the health of the dentition and surrounding tissues.

References

Dentistry